Mountain Rhythm is a 1943 American comedy film directed by Frank McDonald and written by Dorrell McGowan and Stuart E. McGowan. The film stars the vaudeville comedy troupe the Weaver Brothers and Elviry, with Lynn Merrick, Frank M. Thomas and Sally Payne. The film was released on January 8, 1943, by Republic Pictures.

Plot

Cast   
Leon Weaver as Abner Weaver 
Frank Weaver as Cicero Weaver 
June Weaver as Elviry Weaver 
Lynn Merrick as Linda Weaver
Frank M. Thomas as Dr. Elihu Prindle
Sally Payne as Fanniebelle Weaver
Dick Jones as Darwood Gates Alton
Joseph Allen as Bill Burgess 
William Roy as Humphrey Davidson Pepperfield IV 
Earle S. Dewey as Forsythe
Sam Flint as Pierce
Ben Erway as Alton

References

External links
 

1943 films
American comedy films
1943 comedy films
Republic Pictures films
Films directed by Frank McDonald
American black-and-white films
1940s English-language films
1940s American films